The 1969 Preakness Stakes was the 94th running of the $200,000 Preakness Stakes thoroughbred horse race. The race took place on May 17, 1969, and was televised in the United States on the CBS television network. Majestic Prince, who was jockeyed by Bill Hartack, won the race by only a neck over runner-up Arts and Letters. Approximate post time was 5:40 p.m. Eastern Time. The race was run on a fast track in a final time of 1:55-3/5. flat. The Maryland Jockey Club reported total attendance of 42,258, this is recorded as second highest on the list of American thoroughbred racing top attended events for North America in 1969.

Payout 

The 94th Preakness Stakes Payout Schedule

The full chart 

 Winning Breeder: Leslie Combs II; (KY)
 Winning Time: 1:55 3/5
 Track Condition: Fast
 Total Attendance: 42,258

References

External links 
 

1969
1969 in horse racing
1969 in American sports
1969 in sports in Maryland
Horse races in Maryland